Lasiothyris astricta is a species of moth of the family Tortricidae. It is found in Brazil in the states of Minas Gerais, Paraná and Santa Catarina.

References

Moths described in 1983
Cochylini